Tailu is a town in Lianjiang County, Fuzhou, Fujian, China. Tailu is located at the eastern tip of the Huangqi Peninsula / Beijiao Peninsula (including nearby islands) and is bordered to the west by the town of Huangqi and to the south by the East China Sea, across which Lienchiang County (the Matsu Islands), Taiwan (ROC) can be seen.

History

In April 1979, Tailu Commune was established from part of Huangqi Commune.

In June 1984, Tailu Commune became Tailu Township.

In August 1992, Tailu Township became Tailu Town.

In August 2004, a bus traveling from Tailu to Fuzhou crashed killing 17 and injuring 10.

On the morning of May 4, 2016, Jiaonan Village Branch Chinese Communist Party Secretary Liu Wenjian and Niujiao Community Assistant Manager Tsao Erh-Chang met in Nangan Township, Lienchiang County (the Matsu Islands), Taiwan (ROC) and signed a memorandum of mutual exchange and cooperation. Others present included the Magistrate of Lienchiang County, ROC Liu Cheng-ying, Tailu Party Secretary Huang Duanming, Nangan Township Mayor Chen Chen-Ko and others.

In February 2020, the Chinese (PRC) fishing vessel Minyun 60418 which had been fishing near Xiaoqiu in Beigan Township, Lienchiang County (the Matsu Islands), ROC (Taiwan) floated to Tailu without its five man crew.

Geography

Tailu is located at the northeastern tip of the Huangqi Peninsula across from the Matsu Islands (Lienchiang County, ROC (Taiwan)).

Islands in Tailu include:

Daniuyu Dao 
Datan ( / ) 
Dongluo Dao 
Guojiang Yu 
Guo Yu (Guoyu Dao;  / ) 

Hengchengjiao Dao 
Kedou Yu 
Nanliuyu Dao 
Nanwei Yu (Nanweiyu Dao;  / ) 
Santan Dao 
Shuangjiyu Dao / Shuangji Yu ( / ) 
Sitan Dao 
Xiaoniujiaoyu Dao 
Yang Yu (Yangyu Dao;  / )  (site of Yangyu Lighthouse)
Yangyue Dao 
Zhiluo Dao ( / )

Administrative divisions
Tailu includes eight villages:

Beijiao, Hengcheng, Jiaonan, Tailu, Dongluo, Xiubang ( /  / ), Shangtang (Shang-t’ang), Houwan

Demographics

See also 
 List of township-level divisions of Fujian

References

External links

 馬祖日報2016/05/04影音／苔菉鎮茭南村、牛角社協簽署交流合作備忘錄 

Township-level divisions of Fujian
Lianjiang County
Towns in Fujian